"Disney's Halloween Treat" is a 1982 Halloween-themed episode of Walt Disney which originally aired on October 30, 1982.

Plot 
The episode is narrated by a jack-o'-lantern puppet (voiced by Hal Douglas) and features a compilation of Disney short cartoons involving spooky or supernatural themes as well as excerpted segments of various villains from Disney feature films. The opening and closing credits feature an orange colorized version of the 1929 Silly Symphony short The Skeleton Dance as well as its own title theme song, sung in the opening and closing credits. The lyrics were written by Galen R. Brandt with music by John Debney.

Alternate title 
This special was also released under an alternative title, "Scary Tales of Halloween", and was also available in both syndicated and network versions.

Updated version 
An updated version of this program, the Disney Channel exclusive, "A Disney Halloween" aired in 1983 which incorporated segments from both "Disney's Halloween Treat" and "Disney's Greatest Villains" (1977). "Disney's Halloween Treat" was rebroadcast throughout the 1980s up until the mid-1990s.

Featured segments 
 "Madam Mim" – The Sword in the Stone (1963)
 "Night on Bald Mountain" sequence – Fantasia (1940)
 Clip of Pluto's Sweater (1949)
 Clip of Mickey's Parrot (1938)
 Donald Duck and the Gorilla (1944) – Donald Duck and his nephews Huey, Dewey and Louie
 "Pluto's Judgement" sequence featuring three Pluto cartoons assembled together:
 Puss Cafe (1950)
 Cat Nap Pluto (1948)
 Pluto's Judgement Day (1935)
 "Captain Hook" – Peter Pan (1953)
 "Cruella de Vil" – One Hundred and One Dalmatians (1961)
 "The Evil Queen" – Snow White and the Seven Dwarfs (1937)
 "Si and Am" – Lady and the Tramp (1955)
 "Ichabod Crane and Headless Horseman" – The Adventures of Ichabod and Mr. Toad (1949)

Home video release 
"Disney's Halloween Treat" was released on VHS in 1984. As of today, it has not yet been released on DVD, Blu-ray or any streaming platform.

Credits 
 Disney's Sing-Along Songs Heigh-Ho clips courtesy of Walt Disney Home Video
 This program is the results of the talents of many creative people at the Walt Disney Studios.
 The contribution of the ANIMATION STAFF is particularly appreciated.

See also 
 "Our Unsung Villains" (1956)
 "Disney's Greatest Villains" (1977)
 "Halloween Hall o' Fame" (1977)
 "A Disney Halloween" (1981)
 "A Disney Halloween" (1983)
 "Scary Tales" (1986, varies)
Mickey's House of Villains (2002)
Once Upon a Halloween (2005)

References

External links 
 

1982 American television episodes
1982 television specials
1980s American television specials
Halloween television episodes
Halloween television specials
CBS television specials
Walt Disney anthology television series episodes
Films scored by Paul Smith (film and television composer)
Films scored by John Debney